The Pink Door is a restaurant in Seattle's Pike Place Market, in the U.S. state of Washington.

Description 
The Pink Door is located on Post Alley in Pike Place Market, in Seattle's Central Waterfront district. The restaurant serves Italian cuisine and has a covered patio.

Emma Banks of Thrillist described The Pink Door as "a longstanding escape from the hustle and bustle of downtown specializing in Italian-American cuisine". She wrote, "Like lots of Italian food, the menu here is inspired by family gatherings and secret recipes, and like lots of Seattle-area restaurants, the ingredients are mostly local, sourced almost exclusively from Butler Farms just across the water on Bainbridge Island."

History 
The Pink Door was founded in 1981 by Jackie Roberts. The restaurant launched a membership program in 2017. During the COVID-19 pandemic, the business received money from the Restaurant Revitalization Fund in 2021.

Reception 
Emma Banks included The Pink Door in Thrillist's 2022 list of "The Most Romantic Restaurants in Seattle".

See also 

 List of Italian restaurants

References

External links

 

1981 establishments in Washington (state)
Italian restaurants in Seattle
Pike Place Market
Restaurants established in 1981
Central Waterfront, Seattle